On The 11th Of December 1960 demonstrations in Algeria was mass demonstrations and popular pro-independence disobedience movement and violent disturbances that rocked the country of Algeria despite the Algerian War. The protests lasted for a short-loved period of 10 days after the visit of French president Charles de Gaulle. The popular uprising was the biggest political opposition challenge the French has faced in Algeria since the 1916 anti-French uprising. Protesters marched for 10 days in Algeria despite threats of suppression and French attacks on protesters and civilians. Demonstrators waved their hands and chanted pro-freedom and independence slogans in the epicenter of the revolution was, Algiers. Large-scale oppression of protesters, rallies and gatherings were banned as a result of the revolts. Protesters were gunned down, clashed with troops, tanks was deployed to quell rioting and the uprising left hundreds dead. The protests would be known as the beginning of the independence of Algeria in 1962.

See also
 Algerian War

References

1960 protests
Protests in Algeria